Michael F. Lydon (10 October 1907 – 15 May 1977) was an Irish Fianna Fáil politician. A civil engineer, he was elected to Dáil Éireann as a Fianna Fáil Teachta Dála (TD) for the Galway West constituency at the 1944 general election. He was re-elected at the 1948 general election but lost his seat at the 1951 general election. He was an unsuccessful candidate at the 1954 and 1957 general elections. He served as Mayor of Galway from 1952 to 1953.

References

Sources
Role of Honor: The Mayors of Galway City, 1485–2001, William Henry, Galway, 2002.

1907 births
1977 deaths
Fianna Fáil TDs
Members of the 12th Dáil
Members of the 13th Dáil
Politicians from County Galway
Mayors of Galway